The Knights of the Golden Eagle was a fraternal organization founded in Baltimore in 1872.

History 

The orders original objectives were to help its members find employment and aid them while unemployed. Membership was open to white males over 18, without physical or mental handicaps, who were able to write and support themselves, were law-abiding of sound moral character and of the Christian faith. There was a female auxiliary called the Ladies of the Golden Eagle.

In the early years of its existence the group received assistance from other secret societies and fraternal groups. The Odd Fellows helped them become established in Philadelphia in 1875 and the Knights of Pythias helped them become established in Massachusetts in 1880.

Organization 

Local lodges were called "Castles," statewide structures were called "Grand Castles", and the overall group "Supreme Castle". In the early 1920s the Knights were headquartered at 814−816 North Broad Street, Philadelphia. The last known headquarters of the group was in North Wales, Pennsylvania.

Membership 
Membership was open to Christian white men over 18, who were of good moral character, sound mental and physical health, able to write and support himself and were law abiding citizens. By the early 1920s the group had 73,340 in 26 states. Membership began to decline in the 1930s. In 1965 the group had 15,000 members, mostly concentrated in Pennsylvania. In the late 1970s scholar Alvin J. Schmidt was unable to locate a current address for the group, and determined that it was extinct.

Ritual 

The Knights' ritual worked three degrees, based on the history of the Crusades: the first degree accented the pilgrim and taught the candidate fidelity to God and man; the second degree used the medieval knight as its role model to teach the member to revere religion, fidelity, valor, charity, courtesy and hospitality; the third degree was based on the figure of the crusader and it "equipped the member against the evil of his enemies." Members of the Ladies of the Golden Eagle took one degree, the Temple Degree, upon being initiated. Oaths are sworn on an open Bible.

Eagle Home Association 
This was the mutual benefit arm of the Knights, whose object was to protect aged members of the order, as well as their orphans and widows. It was supported by a per capita tax on such Castles as were enrolled in it.

References

External links
 Knights of the Golden Eagle - Survey of Fraternal Order's History

Organizations established in 1872
Fraternal orders
1872 establishments in Maryland
Secret societies in the United States